İlker Sayan (born 4 May 1993) is a Turkish professional footballer who plays as a right winger for TFF Second League club Diyarbekirspor.

Professional career
Sayan spent most of his early footballing career with Dardanelspor in the lower tiers of Turkish football, before brief spells with Kırıkhanspor and Nazilli Belediyespor. Sayan joined Sivasspor in the Süper Lig in 2018. He made his professional debut with them in a 1-0 Süper Lig win over Alanyaspor on 11 August 2018.

References

External links
 
 
 

1993 births
People from Konak
Living people
Turkish footballers
Turkey youth international footballers
Association football midfielders
Dardanelspor footballers
Kayseri Erciyesspor footballers
Nazilli Belediyespor footballers
Sivasspor footballers
Kırklarelispor footballers
Şanlıurfaspor footballers
Süper Lig players
TFF Second League players
TFF Third League players